Martín Mariano Boasso Danielle (born 11 April 1975 in El Trebol, Santa Fe) is an Argentine naturalized Mexican footballer.

External links 
 Argentine Primera statistics  
 
 

1975 births
Living people
Argentine footballers
People from San Martín Department, Santa Fe
Naturalized citizens of Mexico
Argentine emigrants to Mexico
Rosario Central footballers
Gimnasia y Esgrima de Jujuy footballers
Unión de Santa Fe footballers
Irapuato F.C. footballers
C.F. Pachuca players
Tecos F.C. footballers
Association football forwards
Expatriate footballers in Mexico
Expatriate footballers in El Salvador
C.D. FAS footballers
Santos Laguna footballers
Sportspeople from Santa Fe Province